James Nicholas Dolan (16 October 1884 – 14 July 1955) was an Irish politician and TD for County Leitrim constituencies from 1918 to 1937.

Dolan was born in Manorhamilton, County Leitrim, the son of John Dolan, merchant, and Bridget Fitzpatrick. His brother, Charles Dolan, was an Irish Parliamentary Party MP for North Leitrim from 1906 to 1908, who resigned his seat to run as the first ever Sinn Féin parliamentary candidate.

A Sinn Féin activist, and member of the Irish Republican Brotherhood, James Dolan was interned in Frongoch internment camp after the 1916 Easter Rising.

He was first elected as Sinn Féin MP at the 1918 general election for Leitrim. At the 1921 general election, he was elected unopposed as a TD for the Leitrim–Roscommon North constituency, and supported the Anglo-Irish Treaty. At the 1922 general election, he was again elected unopposed for Leitrim–Roscommon North. At the 1923 general election, he was elected for the Leitrim–Sligo constituency.

Dolan joined the government of W. T. Cosgrave as Parliamentary Secretary to the President with responsibility as Government Chief Whip in 1924. He served in that post until 1927. He served as Parliamentary Secretary to the Minister for Industry and Commerce from 1927 to 1932. Dolan lost his Dáil seat at the 1932 general election. He regained his seat in 1933 and became a Fine Gael TD later that year when the new party was formed. He failed to be selected for Fine Gael at the 1937 general election for the new Leitrim constituency. He contested the election as an independent candidate, but was unsuccessful. He subsequently retired from politics.

References

External links

 

1884 births
1955 deaths
Cumann na nGaedheal TDs
Early Sinn Féin TDs
Fine Gael TDs
Members of the 1st Dáil
Members of the 2nd Dáil
Members of the 3rd Dáil
Members of the 4th Dáil
Members of the 5th Dáil
Members of the 6th Dáil
Members of the 8th Dáil
Members of the Parliament of the United Kingdom for County Leitrim constituencies (1801–1922)
UK MPs 1918–1922
Parliamentary Secretaries of the 4th Dáil
Parliamentary Secretaries of the 6th Dáil
People of the Irish Civil War (Pro-Treaty side)
Politicians from County Leitrim
Government Chief Whip (Ireland)